Duryea is a surname. Notable people with the surname include:

Charles Duryea (1861–1938), American automotive pioneer
Dan Duryea (1907–1968), American actor
Herman Barkulo Duryea (1862–1916), American and French horse breeder
J. Frank Duryea, American automotive pioneer
Jesse Duryea (1859–1942), American baseball pitcher 
Laura Duryea (born 1983), Australian rules footballer 
Perry B. Duryea (state senator) (1891–1968), New York state senator 1942–45, and Conservation Commissioner 1945–54
Perry B. Duryea Jr. (1921–2004), Speaker of the New York State Assembly 1969–1974
Peter Duryea (1939–2013), American actor
Taylor Duryea (born 1991), Australian rules footballer
Tim Duryea (born 1964), American basketball coach 
Townsend Duryea (1823–1888), American photographer
Sanford Duryea (1833–1903), photographer, brother of Townsend

See also
 Dury (disambiguation)
 Durie